Teodoro Carlos Quintana (1950 – 13 July 2022) was an Argentine trade unionist and politician. A member of the Front for Victory within the Justicialist Party, he served in the Chamber of Deputies of Buenos Aires Province from 2005 to 2009, elected in the Capital Electoral Section.

Quintana died in Buenos Aires on 13 July 2022.

References

1950 births
2022 deaths
Members of the Buenos Aires Province Chamber of Deputies
21st-century Argentine politicians
Justicialist Party politicians
People from La Plata
Buenos Aires Province politicians